One Is the Other is an album by jazz drummer Billy Hart, released on ECM Records in 2014.

Reception

The AllMusic review by Thom Jurek states "One Is the Other is the sound of an experienced and deeply intuitive quartet speaking in a colorful and precise language  numerous dialects and approaches to musical speech". The Guardian'''s John Fordham noted "For anyone open to spontaneous musical conversation, regardless of genre, this beautifully crafted album is likely to appeal – but aficionados will probably get more from it, since veteran drum star and former Herbie Hancock sideman Hart and his superb quartet constantly hint at references from all over the jazz tradition". Steve Greenlee wrote in JazzTimes that "The Billy Hart Quartet gets more laidback with each release. One Is the Other is the group’s third effort (and second on ECM), and it is a demonstrably looser, freer affair than its predecessors. It’s as though the veteran drummer and his younger compadres—tenor saxophonist Mark Turner, pianist Ethan Iverson, bassist Ben Street—decided they’d proven themselves and can now take more risks with their music". All About Jazz correspondent John Kelman observed "with ECM paying increasing attention to North American musicians—with particular focus on a clearly vibrant New York scene, the sublimely open One is the Other is both this quartet's best record yet, and further evidence to counter those who accuse ECM's purview of being too Euro-centric."

Track listingAll compositions by Billy Hart, except where noted''
"Lennie Groove" (Mark Turner) - 6:50  
 "Maraschino" (Ethan Iverson) - 5:51  
 "Teule's Redemption"  - 7:21  
 "Amethyst" - 8:06  
 "Yard" - 5:07  
 "Sonnet for Stevie" (Turner) - 8:43  
 "Some Enchanted Evening" (Richard Rodgers, Oscar Hammerstein II) - 5:19  
 "Big Trees" (Iverson) - 4:14

Personnel
Billy Hart - drums
Mark Turner - tenor sax
Ethan Iverson - piano
Ben Street - double bass

References

2014 albums
Billy Hart albums
ECM Records albums
Albums produced by Manfred Eicher